Razia Sultana  (1205–1240) was Sultan of Delhi.

Razia Sultana, Razia Sultan, or Raziya Sultan may also refer to:
Razia Sultana (lawyer) (born 1973), Bangladeshi lawyer
Razia Sultana (politician) (born 1966), Punjabi (India) politician
Raziya Sultan (film), a 1983 Hindi film
Razia Sultan (TV series), a 2015 Indian TV series